Rodney Ernest Reid (30 July 1939 – 12 May 2022) was a New Zealand association football player who represented New Zealand at international level and played first-class cricket for Wellington.

Born in Apia in Western Samoa, Reid played 13 first-class matches for Wellington from 1958–59 to 1960–61, taking 33 wickets at 29.72 with his right-arm medium pace and scoring 205 runs at 12.81. He was considered one of the most promising new players of the 1958–59 Plunket Shield season, the Christchurch Press noting: "His medium-paced bowling was remarkably steady, he averaged 25 with the bat, and he finished the series with a hat-trick against Otago." He took his best figures of 6 for 57 in the second innings when Wellington defeated Auckland by an innings in January 1960.

Reid played two official A-international matches for the New Zealand national football team in 1958. The first was a 2–3 loss against trans-Tasman neighbours Australia on 16 August 1958 and the second was a 5–1 win over New Caledonia on 7 September.

References 

1939 births
2022 deaths
New Zealand association footballers
New Zealand international footballers
New Zealand cricketers
Wellington cricketers
Samoan cricketers
Sportspeople from Apia
Samoan emigrants to New Zealand
Association football inside forwards